Ndyuka-Tiriyó Pidgin (Ndyuka-Trio) was a trade language used until the 1960s between speakers of Ndyuka, an English-based creole, and Tiriyó and Wayana, both Cariban languages.

References

English-based pidgins and creoles
Languages of Suriname
Ndyuka people
South America Native-based pidgins and creoles
Tiriyó people
Wayana people